The 1969 Utah State Aggies football team was an American football team that represented Utah State University as an independent during the 1969 NCAA University Division football season. In their third season under head coach Chuck Mills, the Aggies compiled a 3–7 record and were outscored by a total of 250 to 134.

The team's statistical leaders included Dave Holman with 1,511 passing yards, George Tribble with 469 rushing yards, and Wes Garnett with 439 receiving yards.

Schedule

References

Utah State
Utah State Aggies football seasons
Utah State Aggies football